Krušedol may refer to:

Krušedol monastery, a monastery in Srem, Serbia
Krušedol Selo, a village in Srem, Serbia
Krušedol Prnjavor, a village in Srem, Serbia